Sir Randhir Singh Sahib Bahadur  (26 March 1831 – 2 April 1870) was the ruling Raja of the princely state of Kapurthala in the British Empire of India from 1852 until his death in 1870.

Randhir Singh Sahib Bahadur succeeded his father Nihal Singh Sahib Bahadur as the ruler of Kapurthala on 13 September 1852. During the Indian Rebellion of 1857, Randhir Singh assisted the British, first at Jalandhar and later led a mixed force in Awadh where he fought against the rebel soldiers.

Randhir Singh died near the Gulf of Aden on 2 April 1870 on a visit to Europe on board the SS Golconda. 

He had two sons and one daughter by his first wife, one son by his second, and three daughters by his third wife. 

His sons included Raja Kharak Singh Sahib Bahadur, who succeeded him and Raja Harnam Singh. Among his grandsons were Maharaja Jagatjit Singh, who ruled Kapurthala for 67 years, Sardar Bhagat Singh, who was one of the few Indian justices of High Court during the British Raj, and Stuart Gilbert, the British translator.

Honours 
 Knight Grand Commander of the Order of the Star of India (GCSI) (10 December 1864).

References

Maharajas of Kapurthala
1831 births
1870 deaths
Honorary Knights Grand Commander of the Order of the Star of India